Mohamed Haddad (born February 22, 1960) is a Syrian Olympic boxer. He represented his country in the light-flyweight division at the 1988 Summer Olympics. He lost his first bout against Maurice Maina of Kenya.

References

1960 births
Living people
Syrian male boxers
Olympic boxers of Syria
Boxers at the 1988 Summer Olympics
Competitors at the 1983 Mediterranean Games
Competitors at the 1987 Mediterranean Games
Mediterranean Games gold medalists for Syria
Mediterranean Games bronze medalists for Syria
Mediterranean Games medalists in boxing
Light-flyweight boxers
20th-century Syrian people